Chitra Ramanathan or Chitra, is an Indian American contemporary visual artist and educator living in the United States, mainly known for her predominantly abstract mixed media paintings. Her body of work visually portrays happiness. Many of the fine artist’s original works, mainly in the acrylic paint mediums are created in expansive scales, as well as panel paintings as  diptychs or triptychs. Her ongoing works are distinct with the treatment of fresh colors, and collage characterized by
intricately interwoven textures that glow to express the concept of happiness and expression of joy.

Early life 
Chitra Ramanathan was born as Chitra Subramanyam (given name, Parvati) in Thiruvananthapuram, Kerala, South India, to Sarasa and L.N.Subramanyam. She started doodling, painting, and crafting with clay at a young age. By the age of twelve, she had won a number of coloring-in awards from corporate sponsors including Hindustan Unilever Limited. Her paintings had also been presented at the Birla Academy of Arts and Culture in Kolkata, India.

Education and artistic career 
After completing high school at Good Shepherd Convent, Chitra Ramanathan received a Bachelor of Fine Arts from the University of Madras, at Stella Maris College in Chennai, India. She graduated with honors from the University of Illinois at Urbana-Champaign School of Art and Design earning a Bachelor of Fine Arts degree in Painting in 1993 and a Master of Business Administration at the Gies College of Business at the University of Illinois at Urbana-Champaign in 1997. She completed artist residencies at the Camac Centre d’Art in Marnay-sur-Seine, France, in 2010, and the Scuola Internazionale di Grafica, Venice, Italy, in 2012. 

Ramanathan’s career debuted in 1995 through art galleries situated on Soho Broadway, Manhattan, New York City, with solo and group art exhibitions of her paintings. Her work has been exhibited across the United States in galleries and academic institutions including the Florida International University, ARC Gallery, Butler University, Indianapolis Art Center, Vero Beach Museum of Art , Indianapolis Artsgarden, University of Illinois Foundation, and College of Medicine, Illinois. Manhattan Arts, New York, described her paintings as "tactile works that resonate with a quiet harmony" and "reflects the spirituality of her culture". The artist's academically influenced working process, including large-scale installations and commissioned originals evolves continually with each developing piece. While an artist member of the College Art Association, she served in CAA’s Services to Artists Committee from 2003-2006, and the Committee for Diversity Practices from 2007-2010.

In October 2004, a pair of large-sized paintings created by Chitra Ramanathan commissioned by MGM Mirage, now MGM Resorts International were installed in the Bellagio Hotel in Las Vegas. Among her other public-art projects was a  mural painting commissioned by Crooked Creek Elementary School, Indianapolis, Indiana completed in 2008, and large-scale paintings created in varied dimensions displayed in Monument Circle, Indianapolis in 2006 a public art initiative by the Arts Council of Indianapolis titled “Picture Windows 2006: Urban Interpretations”.
In 2005, she was invited to the Royal Academy of Arts, London, where she gave a visual presentation of her series of abstract paintings and conducted student tutorials at the Royal Academy Schools during the academic visit.

Selected Book/Journal publications:

Books:
 International Dictionary of Artists - Artists' Reference Book, First Edition, 2011. Museum quality. Language: English. Full Color. Size: 10" x 13" inches or 25 x 33 cm.Hard cover. Curator: Despina Tunberg. Publisher: World Wide Art Books 
5383 Hollister Ave, # 140
93111 Santa Barbara CA
Tel / fax +1 805 683 3899

 International Contemporary Artists vol I - Ramanathan, Chitra, p.118,Publisher: Lemonidou Eve; 1st edition (October 24, 2010)
Lemonidou Eve (Author) and Editor, Olga Antoniadou (Editor)
In. Co. Artists Books
US: 9 Columbus Avenue, NYC, NY 10024, US 
EU: Athens Towers, 2-4 Messogion Av. Athens 115 27, GR 
http://www.amazon.com/. Paperback: 272 pages
Language: English
ISBN-10: 9609322980
ISBN-13: 978-9609322980

 Biography, Marquis Publications Who’s Who in America 2008, 62nd Edition

 “The Artists Bluebook 2004", Directory of American Artists from the 16th Century to August 2004"- by Lonnie Pierson Dunbier, Editor,www.askART.com "Books on this artist".

 Publication: “Abstracts”, a publication of the College Art Association "World Art: A Panhuman Narrative for Egalitarian Teaching" Co Chair, Art History Session: Presentation: "World Art: A Panhuman Narrative for Egalitarian Teaching" by Barbara Nesin and Chitra Ramanathan, Committee on Diversity Practices- College Art Association (http://www.collegeart.org/) 96th Annual Conference, Dallas-Fort Worth, Texas, USA 2008.

References 

Indian artists
Indian contemporary artists
American artists
Abstract painters
Living people
Painting
American women artists
People from Kerala
Contemporary artists
University of Illinois alumni
University of Illinois Urbana-Champaign alumni
Year of birth missing (living people)